Michael Pérez Ortiz (born 14 February 1993) is a Mexican professional footballer who plays as a defensive midfielder for Liga de Expansión MX club Cancún.

Club career

Youth
Pérez joined Guadalajara's youth academy in 2008. He continued through Chivas Youth Academy getting to play through Chivas ranks from U-17 and U-20. Until finally reaching the first team, John van 't Schip being the coach promoting Pérez to first team in 2012.

Guadalajara
He made his official debut under Dutch coach John van 't Schip as a substitute in a game against Chiapas on 14 October 2013 which he played all 22 minutes.

Loan at Coras
Pérez was loaned out to Coras for 2014–15 season. He made his official debut as a starter on 1 August 2014 at home against Correcaminos UAT.

Honours
Guadalajara
Liga MX: Clausura 2017
Copa MX: Apertura 2015, Clausura 2017
Supercopa MX: 2016
CONCACAF Champions League: 2018

Mexico U22
Pan American Silver Medal: 2015

References

External links
 
 
 
 

Footballers from Jalisco
C.D. Guadalajara footballers
1993 births
Living people
Liga MX players
Ascenso MX players
Liga de Expansión MX players
Footballers at the 2015 Pan American Games
Footballers at the 2016 Summer Olympics
Olympic footballers of Mexico
People from Zapopan, Jalisco
Pan American Games medalists in football
Pan American Games silver medalists for Mexico
Association football midfielders
Medalists at the 2015 Pan American Games
Mexican footballers